The American Football League All-Star game was the annual game which featured each year's best performers in the American Football League (AFL). The game was first played in 1961 and the final AFL All-Star game occurred in 1969, prior to the league's merger with the National Football League (NFL).

All-League Teams
The Sporting News published American Football League All-League Teams for each season played by the American Football League, 1960 through 1969. From 1960 through 1966, the All-League team was selected by the AFL players, and from 1967 through 1969 it was selected by a consensus of The Sporting News (TSN), the Associated Press (AP), United Press International (UPI), and the Newspaper Enterprise Association (NEA).  The All-League AFL selections usually included one player at each team position on offense and on defense (i.e., one quarterback, two guards, four defensive backs, etc.).

All-Star Teams
The AFL did not have an All-star game after its first season in 1960 but from 1961 through 1969, other AFL players were added to the All-League players to form two squads, and the league held All-Star games for those seasons. After every season except 1965, the format consisted of games between All-Star teams from the Eastern and Western divisions. In 1965, the league champion Buffalo Bills played all-stars from the other teams.

The Pro Football Hall of Fame and the NFL include AFL All-Star Games in their statistics for the Pro Bowl. After the AFL–NFL merger of 1970, the name of the NFL's all-star game was changed to the AFC-NFC Pro Bowl. Buffalo Bills rookie running back O.J. Simpson carried the ball on the last play in AFL history in the Houston Astrodome at the 1969 All-Star Game on January 17, 1970.

The 1965 boycott

After the 1964 season, the AFL All-Star Game had been scheduled for early 1965 in New Orleans' Tulane Stadium. After numerous black players were refused service by a number of New Orleans hotels and businesses, black and white players alike lobbied for a boycott. The black players all left days before the game, saying that it was clear they were not wanted. Under the leadership of Buffalo Bills players including Cookie Gilchrist, the players put up a unified front, and the game was successfully moved to Houston's Jeppesen Stadium.

Game history

Broadcasters
The following is a list of the television networks and announcers that broadcast the American Football League All-Star game during its existence.

See also
Pro Bowl
List of American Football League players

References

External links
The African American Registry listing of the 1965 boycott –  link
Post-1961 season
Post-1964 season
Post-1969 season

American football competitions
 
All-star games
Pro Bowl
Boycotts of events